John Rickman (28 May 1913 – 13 October 1997) was a British broadcaster, journalist, and author. A broadcaster with London Weekend Television's World of Sport for 23 years, he was the first person to introduce the sport of horse racing on an independent television channel and is considered one of the important early television broadcasters of that sport. He also worked as a journalist with the Daily Mail and penned the books Homes Of Sport (1952) and Eight Flat Racing Stables (1979).

References

1913 births
1997 deaths
British horse racing writers and broadcasters
British journalists
British writers